Tony Trudgett (born 29 March 1955) is an Australian former rugby league footballer who played in the 1970s and 1980s.

Playing career
Trudgett was a one time premiership winning player with St George Dragons. His career began by representing Illawarra and Country Seconds between 1976-77, Sydney Seconds in 1979, and New South Wales against Great Britain in 1979. 

He transferred to St George Dragons from Dapto in 1978 and played six seasons with the club between 1978-1983. Trudgett won a premiership with St George Dragons in 1979. He had one last season at Penrith Panthers in 1985 before moving to Nambucca Heads, New South Wales in 1986 as a player .

References

1955 births
Living people
St. George Dragons players
Penrith Panthers players
New South Wales rugby league team players
Country New South Wales rugby league team players
Australian rugby league players
Rugby league five-eighths
Rugby league players from Sydney